Jamin, also known as Choba, is a small village of the newly created Kra Daadi district of Arunachal Pradesh. It is located 20 km from Palin town.

Kra Daadi district was created by bifurcating Kurung Kumey district.

References

Cities and towns in Kra Daadi district